Outras Palavras is an album by Brazilian singer and composer Caetano Veloso, released in 1981. The album mixes Brazilian rhythms with genres popular at the time, such as reggae and funk music. The song "Nu com minha música" was covered by Devendra Banhart, Rodrigo Amarante and Marisa Monte on the album Red Hot + Rio 2.

Track listing

All songs by Caetano Veloso except where noted otherwise

References

Caetano Veloso albums
1981 albums
PolyGram albums
Portuguese-language albums
Albums produced by Caetano Veloso